John Stitt was an American football coach.  He was the first head football coach at Bowling Green State Normal School—now known as Bowling Green State University—serving for one season in 1919 and compiling a record of 0–3.

Head coaching record

References

Year of birth missing
Year of death missing
Bowling Green Falcons football coaches